John Douglas Perry (born 13 March 1945) is a former Australian rules football player who played in the VFL between 1964 and 1969 for the Richmond Football Club and from 1970 until 1974 for the North Melbourne Football Club.

Family
The son of John Perry, and Edna "Bob" Perry, née Strang, the daughter of Doug Strang, John Douglas Perry was born at Albury, New South Wales on 13 March 1945.

He was the grandson of William James "Bill" Strang (1883–1937), the nephew of Gordon "Cocker" Strang (1908–1951), Henry Colin Strang (1910–1946), 
Francis Douglas "Doug" Strang (1912–1954), and Allan Strang (1921–1996), and the cousin of Doug's son, Geoff Strang (1944–2003).

Notes

References 
 Hogan P: The Tigers of Old, Richmond FC, (Melbourne), 1996. 
 Tigers Tell Crowe to "Stay Away", The Age, (Wednesday, 29 April 1964), p.21.
 Hart "Steals" Tigers Win, The Age, (Monday, 26 September 1966), p.24.
 Perry and Cable Star, The Age, (Monday, 2 March 1970), p.25.

External links
 
 
 John Douglas Perry, at The VFA Project.

Living people
Richmond Football Club players
Richmond Football Club Premiership players
Wodonga Football Club players
1945 births
Australian rules footballers from Victoria (Australia)
North Melbourne Football Club players
One-time VFL/AFL Premiership players
Australian rules footballers from Albury